"Sunshine (Everybody Needs a Little)" is a song co-written recorded by American country music artist Steve Azar. It was released in January 2010 as the second single from his album Slide On Over Here. Azar wrote the song with Jason Young.

Critical reception
Bobby Peacock of Roughstock gave the song a favorable review, writing that "the lyrics are simple and effective, staying away from the possible clichés that they could easily have developed into." Peacock also praised the song's production and Azar's "slightly grained, laid-back delivery." Dan Milliken of Country Universe gave the song a C+ grade, calling it "about as exciting as a dreamless nap" and "a pleasant enough listen if you’re in the mood for it." In his review of the album, Matt Bjorke of Roughstock wrote that the song is "one of those no-doubter, romantic love songs that just feels like a hit."

Music video
The music video was directed by Eric Welch and premiered in June 2010.

Chart performance
"Sunshine (Everybody Needs a Little)" debuted at number 60 on the U.S. Billboard Hot Country Songs chart for the week of February 27, 2010.

References

2010 singles
Steve Azar songs
Songs written by Steve Azar
2009 songs